The Nation's Capital Swim Club (NCAP) is a swim club in the DMV (DC, Maryland, and Virginia) area.  The club was created in 1978 as the Curl-Burke Swim Club. It changed its name to NCAP in September 2012.  In 2016 USA Swimming ranked it the top club in the nation as part of its USA Swimming Club Excellence program. It has produced a number of Olympic medalists including Tom Dolan, Jack Conger, and Katie Ledecky.

References

External links
 http://www.nationscapitalswimming.com/

Swimming clubs